New Zealand competed at the 2018 Winter Olympics in Pyeongchang, South Korea, from 9 to 25 February 2018. The team consisted of 21 athletes, 17 men and 4 women, across five sports.

The team collected two bronze medals, which made these games the most successful Winter Games for New Zealand; the nation had previously collected only one Winter Olympic medal, a silver at the 1992 Games. The two medals also exceeded High Performance Sport New Zealand's target of one medal for the Games. 

The two bronze medals were won by Zoi Sadowski-Synnott in the women's snowboarding big air and by Nico Porteous in the men's ski halfpipe. Porteous at 16 years 91 days and Sadowski-Synnott at 16 years 353 days became the nation's two youngest Olympic medallists, breaking the previous record of 17 years 100 days set by Danyon Loader at the 1992 Summer Olympics.

Medallists

Competitors
The New Zealand Olympic Committee (NZOC) confirmed a team of 21 athletes, 17 men and 4 women, to compete in five sports. It is the largest delegation New Zealand has sent to the Winter Olympics, surpassing the 18 athletes who were sent to the 2006 Winter Olympics in Torino. The nation participated in the same sports as at the 2014 Winter Olympics.

Sixteen-year-old alpine skier Alice Robinson was New Zealand's youngest competitor; along with fellow 16-year-olds Nico Porteous and Zoi Sadowski-Synnott, the three were the first New Zealand Olympians at either Games to be born in the 21st century. 38-year-old speed skater Shane Dobbin was the oldest competitor.

Alpine skiing

New Zealand qualified two alpine skiers, one male and one female, through the basic quota. They also received one additional quota.

Freestyle skiing

The NZOC announced the first five freestyle skiers on 24 October 2017, adding another two on 8 November 2017, and a further two on 12 January 2018. Jossi Wells withdrew from participating on 9 January 2018 due to injury.

Halfpipe

Ski cross

Qualification legend: FA – Qualify to medal round; FB – Qualify to consolation round

Slopestyle

Skeleton

New Zealand qualified one male skeleton athlete. The NZOC announced the selection of the racer on 19 January 2018.

Snowboarding

The NZOC announced the first four snowboarders on 24 October 2017.

Freestyle

Tiarn Collins also qualified for the men's slopestyle and big air competitions, but was forced to withdraw after dislocated his shoulder in training prior to the start of the games.

Snowboard cross

Speed skating

Individual

Mass start

Team pursuit

See also
New Zealand at the 2017 Asian Winter Games
New Zealand at the 2018 Commonwealth Games

References

2018
Nations at the 2018 Winter Olympics
Winter Olympics